McDorman is a surname. Notable people with the surname include:

Jake McDorman (born 1986), American actor
Leslie McDorman (died 1966), Canadian politician

See also
McGorman